Costruzione Italiana Macchine Attrezzi (CIMA, "Italian Machine Tool Company") is an Italian gear, powertrain, and transmission manufacturer based in Bologna.

CIMA was founded in 1942 as a manufacturer of gear machining equipment before producing its own gears in 1946. Beginning in the 1950s CIMA supplied gears for automobile and motorcycle racing applications, including Scuderia Ferrari, Porsche, Harley-Davidson, Minarelli, and Honda. In 1980 what is now the  purchased CIMA, who went on to expand the into more machinery markets as well as marine applications. In the 90s, CIMA expanded its reach to the aeronautical industry and found more success in racing. After advancing their low pressure vacuum carburizing and gas quenching methods in 2002, CIMA developed even higher performance transmissions for road and race applications. Their transaxles are found in many low volume supercars.

References

Notes

Citations

External links 
 

Automotive motorsports and performance companies
Automotive transmission makers